Havik was built in Batavia in 1808 or 1809. The Dutch government purchased her and had her fitted out in 1809; she then sailed for North America. The British Royal Navy captured her in 1810. She then sailed to Britain where new owners named her Peter Proctor, after the British officer who captured her. She then traded widely and was last listed in 1845. She brought the first group of coolies from India to Australia in 1837.

Havik
The journal of van Willem Veerman, a junior officer serving on Havik, is a little a little unclear about where around Batavia she was built. His journal says, in translation "This ship was built in the town of Lassem, on the north shore of Java near The city of Cheribon. Havik (Hawk) was built as a merchant ship, and now bought for the government and put into service." The main shipyard at Batavia was Onrust island, prior to 1806 when the British destroyed it.

Havik underwent fitting and provisioning in September 1809 and sailed on 20 October.

On 10 February 1810 Havik a Royal Navy schooner.

English account: HMS Thistle gave chase to a vessel hat she had encountered. After seven hours Thistle caught up with her quarry, which hoisted Batavian colours, opened fire, and attempted to ram Thistle. The two vessels exchanged fire for about an hour when the Batavian vessel attempted to sail off. A running engagement ensued. After four hours the Dutch vessel struck. According to Lieutenant Proctor, she was the Batavian naval corvette Havik, of 10 guns, though pierced for 18. She had a crew of 52 men under the command of Lieutenant J. Sterling. Her passengers included the former lieutenant-governor of Batavia, Admiral Buyskes ([Buijskes]), together with his suite. She was on her way to New York with a part cargo of indigo and spices. Havik had one man killed and seven men badly wounded, one of the wounded being the Admiral. On Thistle, a marine was killed and seven men were wounded, Lieutenant Proctor being one of the wounded. During the initial exchange of fire three of Thistles carronades had been dismounted.

Dutch sources: Havik, Lieutenant Steelingh, captain, had an estimated burthen of 200–250 tons (bm). She was on her way to Europe at the time of the encounter. She was armed with six 3-pounder guns and two 1-pounder swivel guns. (This gave her a broadside of 10 pounds, versus Thistles broadside of 66 pounds.) Her complement consisted of 32 men: 30 crew, and two passengers – the Admiral, and his aide. She struck after she had expended all her ammunition.

Thistle and Havik arrived at Bermuda on 20 February. Havik arrived at Portsmouth from Bermuda on 14 June 1810. Her cargo was reported to have a value of £40,000.

Peter Proctor
Peter Proctor, Bouner, master, first appeared in online records when on 30 December 1810 she sailed from Gravesend with the West Indies fleet, bound for St Kitts. After her return in 1811 she sailed for Malta and Smyrna.

On 27 September 1822 Peter Proctor, Brown, master, ran ashore on the lower part of the Knock Sand. She was gotten off after having discharged part of her cargo, and arrived in the Thames. She was returning from St Petersburg with a cargo of tallow and hemp when she grounded. She was stuck for three days, but was gotten off with the assistance of the revenue cutter Fox, Lieutenant St. John, and two fishing vessels. Lieutenant St. John was awarded £120 pounds for the service.

On 26 July 1825 Peter Proctor was at Dominica when a major hurricane hit the island. The hurricane sank or damaged many vessels there. Peter Proctor rode out the gale without injury.

On 26 June 1828 Peter Proctor, Black, master, ran aground at Skanör med Falsterbo as she was sailing from London to St Petersburg. She was gotten off. She then put int Carlsham to discharge and effect repairs.

In 1813 the EIC had lost its monopoly on the trade between India and Britain. British ships were then free to sail to India or the Indian Ocean under a license from the EIC. On 25 October 1829 Peter Proctor, J.Terry, master, sailed for Mauritius and Covelong under a license from the EIC.<ref>[https://hdl.handle.net/2027/mdp.39015065537865?urlappend=%3Bseq=696 LR''' (1831), "Ships Trading to India – 1829".]</ref> In December 1831 she had to put back to Bristol after having sustained damage. She had been sailing to Boston from Bristol when she lost her bulwarks and boats, and sustained other damage. On her return to Bristol she had been out a month.

The EIC gave up its shipping activities in 1833. Peter Proctor sailed between Britain and India in the early 1830s.

With the ceasing of convict transportation to New South Wales becoming imminent by the late 1830s, the colonists there sought a substitute source of cheap labour. In 1837 a Committee on Immigration identified the possibility of importing coolies from India and China as a solution. John Mackay, an owner of indigo plantations in Bengal and a distillery in Sydney, organised the import of 42 coolies from India who arrived on 24 December 1837 on board Peter Proctor. This was the first sizeable transport of coolie labour into Australia.

FatePeter Proctor'' was last listed in 1846 with data unchanged since 1841.

Notes

Citations

References
 
 
 
 

1800s ships
19th-century naval ships of the Netherlands
Captured ships
Age of Sail merchant ships of England